"The Forgotten Prisoners" is an article by Peter Benenson published in The Observer on 28 May 1961. Citing the Universal Declaration of Human Rights articles 18 and 19, it announced a campaign on "Appeal for Amnesty, 1961" and called for "common action". The article also launched the book Persecution 1961 and its stories of doctor Agostinho Neto, philosopher Constantin Noica, lawyer Antonio Amat and Ashton Jones and Patrick Duncan.

Benenson reputedly wrote his article after having learnt that two Portuguese students from Coimbra were imprisoned in Portugal for raising a toast to freedom. The article was reprinted in newspapers across the world and provoked a flood of responses from the readers, marshalling groups in several countries to examine human rights abuses.

While, in 2015, the original story still remains to be verified, the appeal marks the beginning of Amnesty International, founded in London the same year following the publication after Benenson enlisted a Conservative, a Liberal and a Labour MP.

References 

Newspaper articles
Works about human rights
1961 in the United Kingdom